Colette de Jouvenel, also known as Bel-Gazou, (3 July 19131981) was the French producer of an animated film.

She was the daughter of French writer Colette and her second husband, Henri de Jouvenel.

Born at Castel-Novel in Corrèze, she spent her childhood in the care of her English nanny, Miss Draper, only rarely seeing her famous mother.

In 1935, Colette de Jouvenel married Dr. Dausse. She would leave her husband two months later and divorce the following year, in 1936. After this short-lived marriage, she had affairs with several women, notably with Nicole Stéphane.

She produced an animated film for Office de Radiodiffusion Télévision Française, entitled Introduction à Colette. It premiered 18 March 1968.

She is buried next to her mother at Père Lachaise in Paris.

References 

1913 births
1981 deaths